Andrew Caldwell Mailer (April 4, 1853 – December 3, 1909) was an American politician. He was a member of the Wisconsin State Senate, representing Wisconsin's 2nd Senate District from 1897 to 1901. He was a member of the Republican Party.

Life 
Mailer was born in De Pere, Wisconsin, and attended Lawrence University in Appleton, the University of Michigan at Ann Arbor, Rush Medical College in Chicago, and the Bellevue Hospital Medical College in New York City. He was connected with the Pharmaceutical industry for four years before entering the profession of medicine.

He was a member of the De Pere Board of Education from 1890 to 1896, superintendent of the city schools for a few years, and was mayor of De Pere from 1892 to 1894. He died in De Pere, Wisconsin on December 3, 1909.

References

Mayors of places in Wisconsin
Republican Party Wisconsin state senators
People from De Pere, Wisconsin
Lawrence University alumni
University of Michigan alumni
Rush Medical College alumni
New York University Grossman School of Medicine alumni
Physicians from Wisconsin
1853 births
1909 deaths
School board members in Wisconsin
19th-century American politicians